Martin John Amos (born December 8, 1941) is an American prelate of the  Roman Catholic Church. Amos served as an auxiliary bishop of the Diocese of Cleveland in Ohio from 2001 to 2006 and as the eighth bishop of the Diocese of Davenport in Iowa from 2006 to 2017.

Biography

Early life and ministry
Martin John Amos was born on December 8, 1941, in Cleveland, Ohio. He was the oldest of six children born to Martin and Mary Amos. He grew up in a working-class neighborhood on the west side of Cleveland, attending Our Lady of Good Counsel Church. Amos was educated at Benjamin Franklin Elementary School and James Ford Rhodes High School, both in Cleveland.  He then attended Borromeo Seminary College in Wickliffe, Ohio and St. Mary Seminary in Cleveland. Amos graduated from St. Mary in 1968 with a Bachelor of Sacred Theology degree.  He was awarded a Master of Science in Education degree in 1975 from St. John's College in Cleveland

Priesthood 
On May 25, 1968, Amos was ordained a priest of the Diocese of Cleveland by Bishop  Clarence Issenmann at St. John Bosco Church in Parma Heights, Ohio. After his ordination, Amos was assigned as associate pastor of St. James Parish in Lakewood, Ohio.  In 1970, he was posted to St. Thomas Parish in Sheffield Lake, Ohio, serving there until 1973.  Amos was also teaching religion during this period at Elyria Catholic High School in Elyria, Ohio, and Lorain Catholic High School in Lorain, Ohio.  

In 1973, Amos became a teacher at Borromeo Seminary High School.  While teaching he also attended John Carroll University to obtain teaching and administration certifications.  With the closing of the high school in 1976, Amos was appoint academic dean of Borromeo College.  He would also teach Latin and scripture, staying at the college until 1988. In 1983, Amos was also appointed as assistant pastor of St. Dominic Parish in Shaker Heights, Ohio, becoming pastor in 1985.  He would remain at St. Dominic until his appointment as auxiliary bishop.

Auxiliary Bishop of Cleveland 
On April 3, 2001, Pope John Paul II appointed Amos as the titular bishop of Meta and auxiliary bishop of Cleveland  He was installed and consecrated by Bishop Anthony M. Pilla on June 7, 2001, in the Cathedral of St. John the Evangelist in Cleveland. The principal co-consecrators were Auxiliary Bishops Alexander J. Quinn and Anthony E. Pevec.

Bishop of Davenport
On October 12, 2006, Pope Benedict XVI appointed Amos as the eighth bishop of the Diocese of Davenport. He was installed by Archbishop Jerome Hanus on November 20, 2006, with Archbishop Pietro Sambi present, at St. John Vianney Church in Bettendorf, Iowa.
 
Two days before Amos assumed office, the diocese filed for Chapter 11 Bankruptcy protection. As a result of the bankruptcy, the diocese was forced to sell off property, including the bishop's residence, to pay for a financial settlement to sexual abuse victims. Amos had previously requested a small fixer-upper house to live in, believing the bishop's residence too big for him. The diocese sold the chancery building, the St. Vincent Center, and the surrounding property to St. Ambrose University in May 2009. In March 2010, the diocese bought back the St. Vincent Center and five acres of land. A $22 million capital campaign was also initiated in 2009 to replenish diocesan finances and to provide the finances for other projects.

In 2007, Amos announced that the board of trustees of St. Ambrose University had decided to remove the name of Bishop Gerald O'Keefe from the school library. O'Keefe had covered up sexual abuse crimes by priests in the diocese. On July 1, 2010, the diocese re-established Catholic Charities. The organization was initially introduced into the diocese in 1929 by Bishop Henry Rohlman, but discontinued in 1968.

In May 2012, Amos rescinded an invitation to a representative of the Rich Eychaner Charitable Foundation to present a scholarship to Keaton Fuller, a student at the Prince of Peace Catholic School in Clinton, Iowa. The Eychander Foundation promotes anti-bullying legislation and seeks to promote tolerance and non-discrimination for LBGT youth.  Amos and the foundation reached a compromise  in which a foundation representative from the foundation would award the statue to Fuller and a diocesan representative would deliver a pre-approved statement from the foundation.

Retirement
On April 19, 2017 Pope Francis accepted Amos' letter of resignation as Bishop of Davenport and named Monsignor Thomas Zinkula as his replacement. Amos attended the installation mass in Cleveland on July 13, 2015 of Bishop Edward C. Malesic, the new bishop of the Diocese of Cleveland.

After the sudden death of Bishop George Murry from the Diocese of Youngstown in Ohio on June 5, 2020, the Vatican assigned Amos to assist Monsignor Robert Siffrin in running the diocese until a new bishop was installed.  Amos' role was to ordain priests, deacons and transitional deacons in the diocese.   On Tuesday, January 12, 2021, Amos was invited to the installation mass of the new Youngstown bishop, Reverend David J. Bonnar.

See also
 

 Catholic Church hierarchy
 Catholic Church in the United States
 Historical list of the Catholic bishops of the United States
 List of Catholic bishops of the United States
 Lists of patriarchs, archbishops, and bishops

References

Episcopal succession

1941 births
Living people
Saint Mary Seminary and Graduate School of Theology alumni
Religious leaders from Cleveland
Roman Catholic Diocese of Cleveland
Roman Catholic bishops of Davenport
21st-century Roman Catholic bishops in the United States